Piratman (also, Ganzhali-Piratman) is a village and municipality in the Salyan Rayon of Azerbaijan.  It has a population of 926.  The municipality consists of the villages of Piratman and Gəncəli.

References 

Populated places in Salyan District (Azerbaijan)